Julkku is a Finnish Walpurgis Night humour magazine published on even years by the students of Aalto University. First Julkku was published in 1978. Julkku features short jokes, satirical writings and humorous ads, pictures and drawings.

Humor magazines are an important part of Finnish Walpurgis Night, and students in overalls selling them are a common sight in university cities in Finland in late April.

See also
Äpy

References

External links
Homepage of Julkku (in finnish)

1978 establishments in Finland
Finnish-language magazines
Humor magazines
Magazines established in 1978
Mass media in Espoo
Satirical magazines published in Europe
Student magazines
Walpurgis Night traditions